Arna is a genus of tussock moths in the family Erebidae. The genus was erected by Francis Walker in 1855. It contains many species formerly included in the genus Euproctis, such as Arna bipunctapex.

Species
The following species are included in the genus.
Arna apicalis Walker, 1865
Arna atomarina van, Eecke 1928
Arna bipunctapex Hampson, 1891
Arna erema Collenette, 1932
Arna flavolimbatulana Strand, 1918
Arna mesilauensis Holloway, 1976
Arna micronides van, Eecke 1928
Arna minutissima Swinhoe, 1903
Arna perplexa Swinhoe, 1903
Arna phaulida Collenette, 1938
Arna pseudoconspersa
Arna schistocarpa Collenette, 1949

References

Lymantriinae
Moth genera